Lou Levy (December 3, 1910 – October 31, 1995) was a music publisher during the Tin Pan Alley era of American popular music.

Levy established Leeds Music Corporation in 1935 with his friends, lyricist Sammy Cahn and composer Saul Chaplin. He is credited with the discoveries of Cahn and Chaplin, Bob Dylan, Charles Strouse, Richard Adler and Jerry Ross, and Henry Mancini. He also either discovered, managed, or developed the careers of such artists as the Ames Brothers, Petula Clark, Bobby Darin, Eddie Fisher, Connie Francis, Woody Herman, Steve Lawrence, Les Paul, The Andrews Sisters, Buddy Rich, Woody Herman and Charles Aznavour

Levy supplied numerous other singers with hit material: Frank Sinatra with "All or Nothing At All," "Strangers in the Night," and "I'll Never Smile Again"; Petula Clark with "Downtown" and "Call Me"; The Everly Brothers with "Let It Be Me"; Tom Jones with "It's Not Unusual". He published the Beatles' first American hit, "I Want to Hold Your Hand." In 1964, Leeds Music was acquired by MCA

Lou Levy married Maxene Andrews of the Andrews Sisters in 1941; they separated in 1950.

Levy served on the Board of Directors of ASCAP from 1958 to 1970 and was honored by ASCAP in 1986 for "outstanding contributions as a major force in music publishing." In 1987 he received the Songwriters Hall of Fame Abe Olman Award for Excellence in Music Publishing.

References

External links
 

1910 births
1995 deaths
American music publishers (people)
Place of birth missing
Place of death missing